Ananus is a historical Jewish high priest

Ananus may also refer to:

People
Ananus ben Ananus, Herodian-era high priest of Israel
Theophilus ben Ananus, high priest in the Second Temple in Jerusalem

Other uses
 Ananus, a synonym for Holothuria, a genus of sea cucumbers